Glen Parva or Glen Hills is an   Local Nature Reserve in Glen Parva on the south-western outskirts of Leicester. It is owned and managed by Blaby District Council, Leicestershire County Council and Glen Parva Parish Council

An arm of the Grand Union Canal runs along the western side of this site, which also has a pond, wet and neutral grassland, woodland, scrub and hedges.

There is access from neighbouring roads including Parsons Drive.

References

Local Nature Reserves in Leicestershire